Raymorn Sturrup (born 3 May 1992) is a Bahamian international footballer who played college soccer for Thomas University, as a midfielder.

Career
Sturrup has played for IMG Academy and Thomas University.

He made his international debut for Bahamas in 2011, and has appeared in FIFA World Cup qualifying matches.

References

1992 births
Living people
Sportspeople from Nassau, Bahamas
Association football midfielders
Bahamian footballers
Bahamas international footballers
College men's soccer players in the United States
Thomas University alumni